The 1982–83 West Ham United F.C. season was West Ham United's second in the First Division, following promotion at the end of the 1980–81 season. The club was managed by John Lyall and the team captain was Billy Bonds.

Season summary
The season started well for West Ham. By the end of the year they sat in 5th place in the league. A slump in form then occurred and they reached a low position of 14th at the end of March 1983. A late surge saw them win four of their final six games to finish in 8th place. Paul Goddard and François Van der Elst were joint top scorers with 12 goals in all competitions. The next highest scorer was penalty-taker Ray Stewart with 11. Phil Parkes made the most appearances – 50 in all competitions. The season also saw the début of Tony Cottee on 1 January 1983 in a 3–0 home win against Tottenham Hotspur, a game in which he scored.

League table

Results
West Ham United's score comes first

Legend

Football League First Division

FA Cup

League Cup

Squad

References

West Ham United F.C. seasons
West Ham United
1982 sports events in London
1983 sports events in London